Jargalan Rural District is a rural district (dehestan) in Raz and Jargalan District, Bojnord County, North Khorasan Province, Iran. At the 2006 census, its population was 30,659, in 6,965 families.  The rural district has 38 villages.

References 

Rural Districts of North Khorasan Province
Bojnord County